Webster Hill is a summit located in Central New York Region of New York located in the Town of Ava in Oneida County, northeast of Flint Town.

References

Mountains of Oneida County, New York
Mountains of New York (state)